Thomas Tingey Craven (1808 to August 23, 1887) was a 19th-century United States Navy officer who rose to prominence during the Civil War.

Origins and education
He was the oldest son of Tunis Craven, a navy purser, and Hannah (Tingey) Craven, the daughter of Commodore Thomas Tingey, a longtime commandant of the Washington Navy Yard. Another brother, Alfred Wingate, was a noted civil engineer who constructed railroads. Thomas, like his brothers, was a graduate of the American Literary, Scientific, and Military Academy, the forerunner of Norwich University, entering in 1822 and graduating in December 1823.

Naval career
Becoming a Passed Midshipman on May 24, 1828, in 1828 he joined , of the West India Squadron, as sailing master, and took part in the capture of the pirate Federal. After being commissioned lieutenant on May 27, 1830, he spent three years in cruising on USS Boxer, and in 1835/36 was attached to the receiving ship at New York, after which he joined . In 1838 he commanded , Captain Charles Wilkes' flagship in the Antarctic exploring expedition.

In the following July he was made commandant of midshipmen in the United States Naval Academy in Annapolis, becoming commander on December 16, 1852, and remaining at the academy until June 1855. After commanding  of the Mediterranean Squadron for several years, he was ordered to resume his post at Annapolis. In October 1860, he was detached from this place, and, after a short time spent in recruiting service in Portland, Maine, was commissioned captain on June 7, 1861, and assigned to the command of the Potomac Flotilla.

In September 1866, he was placed in command of the navy yard at Mare Island, California, where he received, on October 10 of the same year, his commission as rear admiral, and continued there until August 1868, when he assumed command of the Pacific Squadron. On December 30, 1869, he was retired, but continued on duty in San Francisco until that office was dispensed with.

Family
He married Virginia Wingate, and later Emily Henderson.  He had eight children, and four of his sons attended the naval academy or were connected with the U.S. Navy: Charles Henderson (1843–1898), Henry Smith (1845–1889), Alfred (1846–?) and Macdonough (1858–?) His grandson (Henry's son) Thomas Tingey Craven served in the U.S. Navy in the early 20th century and played a prominent role in the development of naval aviation. His daughter Ida married Frank W. Hackett, who would go on to become Assistant Secretary of the Navy. He is buried at Arlington National Cemetery.

References

1808 births
1887 deaths
United States Navy rear admirals
Burials at Arlington National Cemetery
Norwich University alumni
Union Navy officers